In military strategy, a flying camp, or camp-volant, was a small but strong army of cavalry and dragoons, to which were sometimes added foot soldiers. Such an army was usually commanded by a lieutenant general, and was always in motion, both to cover the garrisons in possession, and to keep the adversary in continual alarm.

See also
Flying Camp, for the American use of the concept in 1776

References

Flying camp
Military strategy